Vadim Nikolaevich Krasnoselsky (born 14 April 1970) is a Transnistrian politician who is the 3rd and current President of Transnistria. Previously, he served as a member of the Supreme Council of Transnistria from the 7th district, as 6th Speaker of the Supreme Council (2015–2016) and the 7th Minister of the Interior.

Biography
On April 14, 1970, Vadim Krasnoselsky was born to parents Nikolai Vasilyevich Krasnoselsky (1939-2016) and Antonina Grigorievna Krasnoselskaya (born 1945) in the village of Dauriya, in the Borzinsky district (now the Zabaykalsky District) of the Russian SFSR of the Soviet Union. This area is located in the Russian Far East. 

Krasnoselsky came from a military family. In 1978 his father was transferred to a military base in Bender in the Moldavian SSR. He attended High School No. 102 (now Gymnasium No. 1) in Bender, and is said to have sat at the same desk of his future wife Svetlana. As a child, Krasnoselsky is reported to have attended a music school, and took part in rowing and other sporting competitions, fulfilling the standards for the title of “Candidate for Master of Sports of the USSR”.

After leaving school in 1987 Krasnoselsky started studying in Odessa, but left during his first year to join a Military Aviation Engineer Higher School in Kharkiv, from which he graduated in 1993. However, he refused to take the oath of allegiance to an independent Ukraine. He subsequently joined the Transnistrian security forces, later becoming a high-ranking official in the Ministry of the Interior. 

From 1998 to 2000, Krasnoselsky was the Deputy Head of the anti-corruption department of the Bendery police force, and from 2000 to 2003, he was Deputy Head of the anti-corruption department in the central office of the Ministry of Internal Affairs of the PMR.

Vadim Krasnoselsky took his degree in law at the Pridnestrovian State University, graduating from the Faculty of Law in 2002. He worked for the Bender police for several years, rising through the ranks before becoming the chief of police in that city.From September 10, 2003, he was the head of the Bendery GOVD (later the Bendery Department of Internal Affairs).

In 2007, Krasnoselsky became Minister of the Interior, serving until 2012 when he started working in business, as an adviser to the Board of Directors of SZAO Interdnestrcom, where he worked for 3 years until 2015. He was elected to the Supreme Council in the 2015 elections, and was appointed as the body's Speaker.

Presidency

Supported by the Sheriff conglomerate, he defeated incumbent President Yevgeny Shevchuk in the 2016 presidential elections, receiving 62% of the vote. He was inaugurated on 27 December at the Nadezhda Aronetskaya State Drama Theatre. On 4 January 2017, he received newly elected Moldovan President Igor Dodon in Bender, who was the second Moldovan leader to visit the Pridnestrovian Moldavian Republic (PMR) in several years. In September 2018, his first major state visit outside of the PMR was to Sukhumi for Abkhazia's Independence Day celebration. In January 2019, he attended the opening of the PMR representative offices in Moscow, replacing the Cooperation Center "Pridnestrovie". On 29 May, he announced the creation of an international lawsuit against Moldova in which the PMR asks for compensation for "the aggression against the people of Transnistria". In August, he attended a ceremony at the base of the Operational Group of Russian Forces with Russian Defence Minister Sergey Shoigu dedicated the 75th anniversary of the Liberation of Moldova in the Second Jassy–Kishinev Offensive. In late October, he met with President Dodon at his presidential residence in Holercani ahead of the Bavaria Conference, scheduled for 4–5 November.

During his presidency, he revived the traditional New Year balls, in which he takes part with his spouse. In September 2017, he ordered the creation of the Tiraspol Suvorov Military School, the youth cadet school of the Armed Forces of Transnistria.

He has expressed his support for Transnistria being a part of Russia on numerous occasions.

Views on Transnistrian culture
Krasnoselsky has proposed raising statues of notable Imperial Russian leaders such as Generalissimo Alexander Suvorov and Prime Minister Pyotr Stolypin.

He has stated that he is a constitutional monarchist, going as far as to say the following during a presidential campaign:

He has stated that he supports the idea of traditional marriage being between a man and a woman.

Controversies 
As Transnistria's Minister of the Interior in 2007, Krasnoselsky was involved in a controversial decision to remove headstones and other memorials to Romanian soldiers in a military cemetery and rededicate the cemetery solely to Soviet soldiers, although remains were not exhumed. The incident sparked controversy within Romania and Germany. Krasnoselsky also made several controversial statements regarding the Romanian soldiers. 

In March 2021, during the COVID-19 pandemic, Moldova gave 1,810 vaccines which were donated by Romania to Transnistria. Krasnoselsky incorrectly stated they came from the World Health Organization (WHO). He later corrected himself and thanked Romania.

He was reelected in the 2021 Transnistrian presidential election. Only Russian observers from the State Duma, were allowed to monitor the vote, posing questions about its legitimacy.

Krasnoselsky is on a list of Transnistrian officials banned from entering the EU.

Family 
His wife, Svetlana Krasnoselskaya, is a philologist and Russian language teacher. He has one son, Ivan, and two daughters, Genevieve and Sofia.

References

External links

Official website of the President of Transnistria

|-

1968 births
Living people
People from Zabaykalsky Krai
Transnistrian people of Russian descent
Presidents of Transnistria
Government ministers of Transnistria
Members of the Supreme Council (Transnistria)
Transnistrian anti-communists
Transnistrian monarchists
Transnistrian military personnel